Anamalaia is a genus of moths of the family Crambidae. It contains only one species, Anamalaia nathani, which is found in India.

References

Pyraustinae
Monotypic moth genera
Moths of Asia
Taxa named by Eugene G. Munroe
Crambidae genera